Frea is a genus of longhorn beetles of the subfamily Lamiinae.

subgenus Crossotofrea
 Frea aedificatoria (Hintz, 1910)
 Frea albescens Breuning, 1961
 Frea albicans Breuning, 1962
 Frea albomarmoratoides Breuning, 1979
 Frea albovittata Breuning, 1935
 Frea annulata Chevrolat, 1858
 Frea annulicornis Breuning, 1942
 Frea assimilis Breuning, 1935
 Frea barbertoni (Distant, 1898)
 Frea bimaculata Breuning, 1942
 Frea bituberculata Breuning, 1964
 Frea bituberculipennis Breuning, 1969
 Frea capensis Breuning, 1938
 Frea comorensis Breuning, 1948
 Frea conradti Breuning, 1964
 Frea flava Breuning, 1935
 Frea flavolineata Breuning, 1942
 Frea flavomarmorata Breuning, 1935
 Frea flavovittata Breuning, 1935
 Frea fusca Breuning, 1961
 Frea girardi Breuning, 1978
 Frea gnathoenioides Breuning, 1953
 Frea griseomaculata Breuning, 1935
 Frea interruptelineata Breuning, 1948
 Frea ivorensis Breuning, 1967
 Frea lata Breuning, 1935
 Frea latevittata Breuning, 1970
 Frea lineata (Hintz, 1913)
 Frea lundbladi Breuning, 1935
 Frea mabokensis Breuning, 1970
 Frea maculata Hintz, 1912
 Frea paralbicans Breuning, 1979
 Frea plurifasciculata Breuning, 1970
 Frea rosacea Breuning, 1935
 Frea rufina Breuning, 1977  
 Frea schoutedeni Breuning, 1935
 Frea similis Breuning, 1977
 Frea tanganycae Breuning, 1955
 Frea thompsoni Breuning, 1956
 Frea tuberculata Aurivillius, 1910
 Frea unifasciata (Thomson, 1858)
 Frea unifuscovittata Breuning, 1967
 Frea unipunctata Breuning, 1942
 Frea virgata (Quedenfeldt, 1882)
 Frea ziczac Breuning, 1938

subgenus Cyrtofrea
 Frea albolineata (Aurivillius, 1910)
 Frea subcostata Kolbe, 1891
 Frea sublineatoides Breuning, 1962

subgenus Frea
 Frea basalis Jordan, 1894
 Frea brevicornis (Gahan, 1898)
 Frea castaneomaculata Aurivillius, 1908
 Frea circumscripta Hintz, 1910
 Frea curta (Chevrolat, 1858)
 Frea flavicollis (Aurivillius, 1914)
 Frea flavomaculata Breuning, 1956
 Frea flavoscapulata Fairmaire, 1897
 Frea flavosparsa Aurivillius, 1914
 Frea floccifera Quedenfeldt, 1885
 Frea fulvovestita (Fairmaire, 1893)
 Frea grisescens Aurivillius, 1921
 Frea haroldi (Quedenfeldt, 1883)
 Frea holobrunnea Breuning, 1970
 Frea humeraloides Breuning, 1969
 Frea jaguarita (Chevrolat, 1855)
 Frea jaguaritoides Breuning, 1977
 Frea johannae (Gahan, 1890)
 Frea laevepunctata Thomson, 1858  
 Frea maculicornis Thomson, 1858
 Frea marmorata Gerstaecker, 1871
 Frea mniszechi (Thomson, 1858)
 Frea moheliana Breuning, 1957
 Frea nyassana Aurivillius, 1914
 Frea proxima Breuning, 1938
 Frea senilis (White, 1858)
 Frea sparsa (Klug, 1833)
 Frea sparsilis Jordan, 1894
 Frea taverniersi Breuning, 1973
 Frea unicolor Breuning, 1938
 Frea vadoni Breuning, 1980
 Frea vagepicta (Fairmaire, 1871)
 Frea vermiculata Kolbe, 1894
 Frea viossati Adlbauer, 1994
 Frea zambesiana Hintz, 1912

References

Crossotini